Motley is a rural locality in the Toowoomba Region, Queensland, Australia.

Geography
Motley is on the Darling Downs.

Road infrastructure
The Toowoomba–Cecil Plains Road runs along the northern boundary.

History 
The locality takes its name from a former railway station, which in turn was assigned on 5 August 1915 by the Queensland Railways Department derived from the parish name.

Motley State School opened on 14 August 1922 and closed on 14 July 1936.

References

External links

Toowoomba Region
Localities in Queensland